Lespedeza is a genus of some 40 species (including nothospecies) of flowering plants in the pea family (Fabaceae), commonly known as bush clovers or (particularly East Asian species) Japanese clovers (hagi). The genus is native to warm temperate to subtropical regions of eastern North America, eastern and southern Asia and Australasia.

These shrubby plants or trailing vines belong to the "typical" legumes (Faboideae), with the peas and beans, though they are part of another tribe, the Desmodieae. Therein, they are treated as type genus of the smaller subtribe Lespedezinae, which unites the present genus and its presumed closest relatives, Campylotropis and Kummerowia.

Name of the plant
According to American botanist Asa Gray (1810 – 1888), the Lespedeza owes its name to governor of East Florida Vicente Manuel de Céspedes (1784-1790; who, through a letter, allowed botanist André Michaux to explore East Florida in search of new species of plants, where Michaux found Lespedeza), but when Céspedes wrote the letter, at the beginning of it, the name of Céspedes was changed to "Zespedez". So, when Michaux's book Flora Boreali-Americana of 1802 was printed, the name "Céspedes" to refer to the plant was written as "Lespedez", the word from which the current name of the plant was derived.

Despeleza is a synonym of Lespedeza, and this name is derived from a taxonomic anagram.

Cultivation and uses
Some species are grown as garden or ornamental plants, and are used as a forage crops, notably in the southern United States, and as a means of soil enrichment and for prevention of erosion. In some areas, certain species are invasive. Lespedeza, like other legumes, have root nodules that harbor bacteria capable of nitrogen fixation from the air into a soil-bound form that can be taken up by other plants. Growers can take advantage of this process by putting the plants in their fields to release nitrogen, so they can use less fertilizer.

L. bicolor leaves and roots contain l-methoxy-N,N-dimethyltryptamine (lespedamin), as well as related Nω,Nω-dimethyltryptamines and their oxides, as well as some bufotenin.

Species

The species and nothospecies recognized in Lespedeza include:
 Lespedeza angustifolia (Pursh) Elliott
 Lespedeza × angustifolioides T.B.Lee
 Lespedeza bicolor Turcz. (syn. L. bicolor var. japonica Nakai) – shrub lespedeza
 Lespedeza buergeri Miq.
 Lespedeza capitata Michx. (syn. L. frutescens Elliott, L. stuevei DC.)
 Lespedeza caraganae Bunge
 Lespedeza chinensis G.Don
 Lespedeza cuneata (Dumont-Cours.) G. Don (syn Lespedeza sericea)
 Lespedeza cyrtobotrya Miq. – leafy lespedeza
 Lespedeza cyrtobuergeri Akiyama & H.Ohba
 Lespedeza davidii Franch.
 Lespedeza davurica (Laxm.) Schindl.
 Lespedeza × divaricata (Nakai) T.B.Lee
 Lespedeza dunnii Schindl.
 Lespedeza elegans Cambess.
 Lespedeza elliptica Benth.
 Lespedeza fasciculiflora Franch.
 Lespedeza floribunda Bunge (syn. L. bicolor Prain)
 Lespedeza fordii Schindl.
 Lespedeza forrestii Schindl.
 Lespedeza gerardiana Maxim.
 Lespedeza hirta (L.) Hornem.
 Lespedeza hirta ssp. curtissii Clewell (syn. L. hirta Elliott)
 Lespedeza homoloba Nakai
 Lespedeza inschanica (Maxim.) Schindl. – greenish juncea lespedeza
 Lespedeza intermedia (S.Watson) Britton (syn. L.  frutescens (L.) Britton, L. frutescens var. acutifructa Farw.)
 Lespedeza intermixta Makino (possibly a hybrid) – neonchul lespedeza
 Lespedeza japonica L.H.Bailey
 Lespedeza juncea (L.f.) Pers. – juncea lespedeza
 Lespedeza juncea var. sericea (Thunb.) Lace & Hauech (syn. L. cuneata (Dum.Cours.) G.Don)
 Lespedeza junghuhniana Bakh.f.
 Lespedeza kagoshimensis Hatus.
 Lespedeza leptostachya A.Gray
 Lespedeza maximowiczii R.C.Schneid. – Korean lespedeza
 Lespedeza melanantha Nakai – black-flower lespedeza
 Lespedeza mucronata Ricker
 Lespedeza × patentibicolor T.B.Lee
 Lespedeza pilosa (Thunb.) Siebold & Zucc. – pilose lespedeza
 Lespedeza potaninii Vassilcz.
 Lespedeza procumbens Michx.
 Lespedeza pubescens Hayata
 Lespedeza repens (L.) W.P.C.Barton
 Lespedeza × simulata Mack. & Bush
 Lespedeza speciosa Maxim.
 Lespedeza stuevei Nutt.
 Lespedeza texana Britton
 Lespedeza thunbergii (DC.) Nakai (syn. L. elliptica Maxim., L. formosa (Vogel) Koehne, L. formosa ssp. elliptica (Maxim.) Akiyama & H.Ohba)
 Lespedeza thunbergii var. var. thunbergii (DC.)Nakai (syn. L. patens Nakai, L. patens var. obtusifolia Nakai)
 Lespedeza thunbergii var. velutina (Nakai) H.Ohashi (syn. L. intermedia Nakai, L. intermedia var. angustifolia Nakai)
 Lespedeza tomentosa (Thunb.) Maxim. (syn. L. hirta Miq.) – woolly lespedeza
 Lespedeza violacea (L.) Pers.
 Lespedeza virgata (Murray) DC. – Wando lespedeza
 Lespedeza virginica (L.) Britton (syn. L. angustifolia Darl.)
 Lespedeza wilfordii Ricker

The identity and specific validity of L. schindleri is unclear. In addition, there are some species formerly in this genus that are now placed elsewhere, typically in the Lespedezinae, for example, in genus Campylotropis. These include:
 Lespedeza speciosa Schindl. = Campylotropis speciosa (Schindl.) Schindl.
 Lespedeza striata (Thunb.) Hook. & Arn. = Kummerowia striata (Thunb.) Schindl.
 Lespedeza tomentosa Maxim. = Campylotropis pinetorum (Kurz) Schindl.

Footnotes

References
 International Legume Database & Information Service (ILDIS) (2005): Genus Lespedeza. Version 10.01, November 2005. Retrieved 2011-FEB-18.
 Morimoto, Hiroshi & Matsumoto, Norichika (1966). Über Alkaloide, VI. Inhaltsstoffe Lespedeza bicolor var. japonica, II. ["Alkaloid contents of L. bicolor var. japonica II."] J. Liebigs Ann. Chem. 682(1): 212–218 [in German]. 
 Morimoto, Hiroshi & Oshio, Haruji (1965). Über Alkaloide, V. Inhaltsstoffe von Lespedeza bicolor var. japonica, I. Über Lespedamin, ein neues Alkaloid. ["Alkaloid contents of L. bicolor var. japonica I. On Lespedamin, a novel alkaloid."] J. Liebigs Ann. Chem. 682(1): 212–218 [in German].

External links

 Sericea in conservation farming, a freely readable informational booklet scan hosted by the University of North Texas Digital Library
 Lespedeza bicolor at the National Resources Conservation Service. Contains information, images, and a map of its North American distribution.

 
Fabaceae genera